is a district located in Tokushima Prefecture, Japan.

As of June 1, 2019, the district has an estimated population of 2,144 and a density of 49.8 persons per km2. The total area is 42.28 km2.

Towns and villages
Sanagōchi

References

Districts in Tokushima Prefecture